Lorde is a crater on Mercury.  Its name was adopted by the International Astronomical Union (IAU) in 2022. The crater is named for American poet Audre Lorde.

References

Impact craters on Mercury